Theodora Clemens Hall (née Easterfield, 12 June 1902 – 19 December 1980) was a New Zealand medical doctor. She was born in Wellington, Wellington, New Zealand on 12 June 1902. Her father was Thomas Easterfield, a professor of chemistry and physics, and her sister Dr Helen Deem.

Hall attended Wellington Girls' College. She graduated MB ChB from the University of Otago in 1926. She  became a house surgeon at Wellington Hospital, followed by two years as a registrar at Cook Hospital in Gisborne. She did post-graduate study in London in the early 1930s gaining her MRCP diploma in 1932. She was the second New Zealand woman to obtain the MRCP.  She was appointed to Cook Hospital in Gisborne in 1935. In 1932 she married Dr Richard John Burnside Hall (1894–1907) who was surgeon superintendent at Cook Hospital. As surgeon and physician they were described as "the backbone of the Cook Hospital medical service".

The Halls moved to Paihia in 1958 when Richard retired but Theodora continued to work as a physician at the Bay of Islands Hospital. She held that role until 1971.

Personal life 
The Halls had three daughters. Hall died in 1980.

References

1902 births
1980 deaths
New Zealand women medical doctors
People from Wellington City
20th-century New Zealand medical doctors
20th-century women physicians
People educated at Wellington Girls' College